Slobodan Bojic (born ) is a Montenegrin male volleyball player. He is part of the Montenegro men's national volleyball team. On club level he plays for CS Sfaxien.

References

External links
 profile at FIVB.org

1992 births
Living people
Expatriate volleyball players in Tunisia 
Montenegrin men's volleyball players
Place of birth missing (living people)